The  superyacht Madame Kate was launched by Amels Holland B.V. at their yard in Vlissingen. Laura Sessa, from Nuvolari Lenard, worked as designer for creating an interior that perfectly complements the theme of Tim Heywood’s lines. She has two sister ships, the 2013 built Event and the 2018 built Sea & Us.

Design 
The hull is built out of steel while the superstructure is made out of aluminium with teak laid decks. The yacht is Lloyd's registered, issued by Cayman Islands.

Some of the yacht's features include an enclosed lounge on the sun deck, a Touch & Go helicopter platform on the foredeck, and two folding balconies, as well as a large beach club. The Beach Club boasts a swim platform, retractable stairs, a Sauna, a steam shower and Gym equipment.

Engines 
She is powered by twin Caterpillar 3512C engines.

See also
 List of motor yachts by length
 List of yachts built by Amels BV

References

2015 ships
Motor yachts
Ships built in the Netherlands